Mills Glacier is an alpine glacier near the base of the east mountain face of Longs Peak, in Rocky Mountain National Park in the U.S. state of Colorado.

See also
List of glaciers in the United States

References

Glaciers of Rocky Mountain National Park
Landforms of Boulder County, Colorado